The smallhead dragonet (Callionymus erythraeus) is a species of dragonet native to the western Indian Ocean where it occurs at depths of from .  It prefers sandy or muddy substrates with occasional rocks.  This species grows to a length of  TL.

References 

E
Fish described in 1934